Dongguantou station is a station on Line 14 of the Beijing Subway. The station opened on December 31, 2021.

See also 
Dongguantou Nan station on Line 16 and Fangshan line

References 

Beijing Subway stations in Fengtai District